Mohammed Ahmed Al-Waked (born 31 December 1991) is a Saudi Arabian footballer who plays as a goalkeeper for Al-Jabalain.

Club career

Al-Hilal
On 4 December 2013, Al-Hilal promoted Mohammed Al-Waked due to manager Sami Al-Jaber interest, Al-Hilal gave him a three-year professional contract.

Al-Shoulla (loan)
On 10 January 2015, Al-Shoulla loaned Al-Waked for the rest of the 2014–15 season. On February 6, Al-Waked played his professional debut against his parent club Al-Hilal, which they lost 2–1. On February 14, Mohammed played his second match against Al-Khaleej, Al-Shoulla drew 1–1. On March 22, Al-Waked won his first league game when he played against Al-Taawoun, his team won 4–3. On April 4, Al-Waked kept a clean sheet for Al-Shoulla against Al-Fateh. On May 15, He played last match for Al-Shoulla against Al-Faisaly, which Al-Shoulla won 2–1. He returned to Al-Hilal in 2015.

Al-Jabalain
On 29 January 2022, Al-Waked joined Al-Jabalain.

Honours

Club
Al-Hilal
Saudi Professional League: 2016–17, 2017–18, 2019–20
King Cup: 2015, 2017
Saudi Crown Prince Cup: 2012–13, 2015–16
Saudi Super Cup: 2015, 2018, 2021
AFC Champions League: 2019, 2021

References

External links
 

1991 births
Living people
Association football goalkeepers
Saudi Arabian footballers
Al Hilal SFC players
Al-Shoulla FC players
Al-Qadsiah FC players
Al-Jabalain FC players
Saudi Professional League players
Saudi First Division League players